Calijah Demetrius Kancey (born March 1, 2001) is an American football defensive tackle for the Pittsburgh Panthers. He was named a unanimous All-American and the ACC Defensive Football Player of the Year in 2022.

Early life
Kancey attended Miami Northwestern Senior High School in Miami, Florida. Over his final two seasons in high school he had over 200 tackles combined. He committed to the University of Pittsburgh to play college football.

College career
Kancey played in one game his freshman year at Pittsburgh in 2019, the 2019 Quick Lane Bowl, and took a redshirt. In 2020, he played in 11 games and started the final four games of the season. He recorded 27 tackles and 1.5 sacks. As a 14-game starter in 2021, Kancey had 35 tackles and seven sacks and was named a third-team All-American by the Associated Press. He returned to Pittsburgh as a starter in 2022.

References

External links
Pittsburgh Panthers bio

2001 births
Living people
All-American college football players
American football defensive tackles
Pittsburgh Panthers football players
Players of American football from Miami